William Everett Derryberry (October 11, 1906 – October 26, 1991) was an American football player and coach and university president.

College football
Derryberry was a football player at the University of Tennessee, lettering in 1925 and 1927. He was the first person in that school's history to earn a perfect 4.0 grade point average. He was a member of the Sigma Chi Fraternity (Beta Sigma chapter) at the University of Tennessee and was recognized by the fraternity as a Significant Sig in 1977. He served as the head football coach at the University of Tennessee Junior College at Martin (now known as UT Martin) from 1934 to 1936.

Before and after his coaching career, he earned two degrees from Oxford University in Oxford, England while studying as a Rhodes Scholar.

Tennessee Tech presidency
Derryberry was the president of Tennessee Technological University from 1940 to 1974.

References

External links
 

1906 births
1991 deaths
Heads of universities and colleges in the United States
American football halfbacks
American Rhodes Scholars
Alumni of the University of Oxford
Tennessee Technological University people
Tennessee Volunteers football players
UT Martin Skyhawks football coaches
People from Mount Pleasant, Tennessee
Players of American football from Tennessee
20th-century American academics